Malphas: Book of Angels Volume 3 is an album by Sylvie Courvoisier and Mark Feldman performing compositions from John Zorn's second Masada book, "The Book of Angels".

Reception

The Allmusic review by Thom Jurek awarded the album 4 stars stating "Malphas is a success from start to finish, and perhaps the most exciting of the three volumes in the series thus far. Listeners looking for excellence and adventure would be wise to keep an eye out for this duo, who are perhaps redefining the space for modern composition and performance".

Track listing 
All compositions by John Zorn
 "Azriel" - 4:15
 "Basus" - 3:28
 "Rigal" - 4:16
 "Kafziel" - 4:24
 "Labariel" - 6:22
 "Zethar" - 1:49
 "Paschar" - 5:22 - (title misspelled on sleeve as "Paschal")
 "Boel" - 4:35
 "Sammael" - 3:07
 "Padiel" - 6:29
 "Vretil" - 2:49 - (title often misspelled as "Sretil")

Personnel 
 Sylvie Courvoisier – piano 
 Mark Feldman – violin

References 

2006 albums
Albums produced by John Zorn
Book of Angels albums
Tzadik Records albums
Sylvie Courvoisier albums
Mark Feldman albums